This is a list of golfers who graduated from the Web.com Tour and Web.com Tour Finals in 2017. The top 25 players on the Web.com Tour's regular season money list in 2017 earned PGA Tour cards for 2018. The Finals determined the other 25 players to earn their PGA Tour cards and the priority order of all 50.

As in previous seasons, the Finals featured the top 75 players on the Web.com Tour regular season money list, players ranked 126–200 on the PGA Tour's regular-season FedEx Cup points list (except players exempt through other means), non-members of the PGA Tour with enough regular-season FedExCup points to place 126–200, and special medical exemptions.

To determine the initial 2018 PGA Tour priority rank, the top 25 Web.com Tour regular season players were alternated with the top 25 Web.com Tour Finals players. This priority order will then be reshuffled several times during the 2018 season.

Chesson Hadley was fully exempt for the 2017–18 PGA Tour season after leading both the full-season money list and the Finals money list.

2017 Web.com Tour Finals

*PGA Tour rookie in 2018
†First-time PGA Tour member in 2018, but ineligible for rookie status due to having played eight or more PGA Tour events in a previous season
 Earned spot in Finals through PGA Tour.
 Earned spot in Finals through FedEx Cup points earned as a PGA Tour non-member.
 Earned spot in Finals through a medical extension.
 Indicates whether the player earned his card through the regular season or through the Finals.

Results on 2017–18 PGA Tour

*PGA Tour rookie in 2018
†First-time PGA Tour member in 2018, but ineligible for rookie status due to having played eight or more Tour events in a previous season
 Retained his PGA Tour card for 2019: won or finished in the top 125 of the FedEx Cup points list.
 Retained PGA Tour conditional status and qualified for the Web.com Tour Finals: finished between 126–150 on FedEx Cup list and qualified for Web.com Tour Finals.
 Failed to retain his PGA Tour card for 2019 but qualified for the Web.com Tour Finals: finished between 150–200 on FedEx Cup list.
 Failed to retain his PGA Tour card for 2019 and to qualify for the Web.com Tour Finals: finished outside the top 200 on FedEx Cup list.

Roberto Díaz, Stephan Jäger, Matt Jones, Nicholas Lindheim, Denny McCarthy, Adam Schenk, Ben Silverman, Shawn Stefani, and Cameron Tringale regained their cards through the 2018 Web.com Tour Finals.

Winners on the PGA Tour in 2018

Runners-up on the PGA Tour in 2018

References

External links
Web.com Tour official site

Korn Ferry Tour
PGA Tour
Web.com Tour Finals graduates
Web.com Tour Finals graduates